Angus William McDougall (2 April 1913 – 3 May 1983) was a New Zealand cricketer. 

A tall medium-pace bowler with a military bearing, and a useful lower-order batsman, McDougall played eight first-class matches for Otago between 1944 and 1947. In Otago's match against the visiting Australian team in 1946 he took three wickets, and against the English team in 1947 he took seven wickets, including those of Wally Hammond and Denis Compton. He took his best bowling figures in the Plunket Shield match against Auckland in 1946-47, when he took 3 for 68 and 4 for 44 (match figures of 53–13–112–7).

McDougall attended Timaru Boys' High School before moving to Dunedin in the 1930s. He joined the police force in Dunedin in 1934, and in 1937 was transferred from the uniform branch to the detective branch. In 1946 he was promoted to detective-sergeant. He worked as a detective throughout his cricket career with Otago. He was transferred to Invercargill in March 1947, effectively ending his first-class cricket career. While stationed in Invercargill, he was promoted to senior detective in 1955.

See also
 List of Otago representative cricketers

References

External links
 

1913 births
1983 deaths
People educated at Timaru Boys' High School
New Zealand cricketers
Otago cricketers
Cricketers from Dunedin
People from Port Chalmers
New Zealand police officers